"Dozy Vs. Drake - Upon Further Consideration" is a limited edition remix album released on CD5 through Revival Records. Dozy (aka Chris Elles) collaborated with Drake Tungsten to create a 33:55 minute long electronica-based track. According to AMG, "a DJ who called himself Dozy borrowed a handful of Tungsten's songs and remixed them to the point that they sounded nothing like the original."

Track listing
 "Upon Further Consideration" - 33:55

References

External links

 Peek-A-Boo Records: Drake Tungsten page
 Spoon Official Website

1998 singles
Drake Tungsten songs
1996 songs